Monaco competed at the 2000 Summer Olympics in Sydney, Australia.

Results by event

Swimming
Men's 100 m breaststroke
Sylvain Faure
Preliminary Heat – 1:05.51 (→ did not advance)

References
Official Olympic Reports

Nations at the 2000 Summer Olympics
2000 Summer Olympics
Summer Olympics